Thomas Francis "Red" Hearden (September 8, 1904 – December 27, 1964) was an American football player and coach. 

Tom Hearden was born in Appleton, Wisconsin.  As a boy, his family move to Green Bay, Wisconsin.   From 1920–22 He played in the backfield for Green Bay East High School's football team with his brothers and Jim Crowley. He played college football at the University of Notre Dame, under head coach Knute Rockne, and professionally in the National Football League (NFL) as a halfback for the Green Bay Packers, under head coach Curly Lambeau, and the Chicago Bears, under head coach George Halas.

College career

College football
As a sophomore, he was a member of the 1924 National Championship team that featured the Four Horsemen backfield (including Crowley). That team defeated Stanford, led by Ernie Nevers and coached by Pop Warner, in the 1925 Rose Bowl, although Hearden did not appear in that game. He was team captain his senior year and a three-year letterman.

Coaching career
In 1930, Hearden coached for the St. Catherine's High School (Racine, Wisconsin) program, obtaining a record of 26–3–3 and two Catholic conference titles. He coached for Racine Park for the 1934–35 seasons, and posted an 8–5–3 record. In 1936, Hearden returned to his alma mater, Green Bay East High School, and achieved a 51–3–1 mark through 1942. East won 32 straight games at one point and won or shared six conference titles in that seven-year stretch.

He joined the navy in 1943. After the war, he returned to Wisconsin. As the head football coach at St. Norbert College from 1946 to 1952, he compiled a record of 40–14. He joined the Green Bay Packers in 1954 and stayed for two years, leaving to serve as an assistant coach at the University of Wisconsin in 1956. He returned to the Packers in 1957. Later that same year, he suffered a stroke, ending his coaching career.

Awards and honors
 1952 Notre Dame Club of Green Bay "Man of the Year"
 1959 St. Norbert College Alma Mater Award
 1965 WFCA Wisconsin High School Coach of the Year
 1980 WFCA Hall of Fame
 1986 St. Norbert College Hall of Fame

Head coaching record

College

See also
 List of Chicago Bears players
 List of Green Bay Packers players

References

External links
 
 

1904 births
1964 deaths
American football halfbacks
Chicago Bears players
Green Bay Packers coaches
Green Bay Packers players
Iowa Pre-Flight Seahawks football coaches
Notre Dame Fighting Irish football players
St. Norbert Green Knights athletic directors
St. Norbert Green Knights football coaches
Wisconsin Badgers football coaches
High school football coaches in Wisconsin
Green Bay East High School alumni
Sportspeople from Appleton, Wisconsin
Coaches of American football from Wisconsin
Players of American football from Wisconsin